Niles Township is one of 29 townships in Cook County, Illinois, USA.  As of the 2010 census, its population was 105,882.

Geography

Cities, towns, villages
 Glenview (southeast segment)
 Golf
 Lincolnwood
 Morton Grove (east three-quarters)
 Niles (southeast half)
 Skokie

Adjacent townships
 New Trier Township (north)
 Maine Township (west)
 Northfield Township (northwest)

Cemeteries
The township contains these eight cemeteries: Beth Jacob, Dewes, Memorial, New Light, Saint Adelbert, Saint Matthews, Saint Pauls Lutheran and Saint Peters Catholic.

Major highways
  Interstate 94
  U.S. Route 14
  U.S. Route 41
  Illinois Route 43
  Illinois Route 50
  Illinois Route 58

Airports and landing strips
 Lincolnwood Town Center Heliport

Education

Public schools 
The Niles Township area contains ten main public school districts. Nine are elementary and middle/junior high school districts, pre-kindergarten through eighth grade. One is a high school district containing two high schools with grades nine through twelve:
 Golf School District 67
 Skokie School District 68
 Skokie/Morton Grove School District 69
 Morton Grove School District 70
 Niles Elementary School District 71
 Fairview South School District 72
 East Prairie School District 73
 Skokie School District 73½
 Lincolnwood School District 74
 Niles Township High School District 219

Religious day schools 

 Jewish

 Arie Crown Hebrew Day School (pre-K through 8th), boys and girls
 Cheder Lubavitch Hebrew Day School (pre-K through 8th), separate boys and girls programs
 Hillel Torah North Suburban Day School (pre-K through 8th), boys and girls
 Ida Crown Jewish Academy (9th through 12th), boys and girls
 Fasman Yeshiva High School (9th through 12th), boys only
 Solomon Schechter Day School Ginsburg Early Childhood Center. From 1978 to 2012 the day school had a campus in Skokie. After 2012 day students were moved to Northbrook, and the building is now MCC Academy's elementary school. The closure of the Skokie facility occurred as fewer Jewish people lived in Skokie.

 Muslim

 MCC Academy (Pre-K through elementary are in Skokie, with secondary students in Morton Grove)

 Roman Catholic

 St. Joan of Arc School (K-8), of the Roman Catholic Archdiocese of Chicago

Higher education 
Oakton Community College is the area community college and is one of the top rated community colleges in the Midwest, with a main campus in Des Plaines and a satellite campus in Skokie. Oakton offer associate degrees, certificate programs, non-credit classes, and emeritus classes, as well as vocational programs, technology education, and classes in the visual and performing arts. The school's athletic program offers competitive volleyball, basketball, golf, tennis, baseball, softball, soccer, track, cross country, cheerleading, and intramural sports. Oakton's foreign language offerings include Arabic, Chinese, French, German, Hebrew, Italian, Japanese, Korean, Polish, Russian, and Spanish, as well as English as a second language, and resources exist to support students with physical, mental, emotional and behavioral disabilities.

Political districts
 Illinois's 9th congressional district
 State House District 15
 State House District 16
 State House District 17
 State House District 18
 State House District 20
 State Senate District 08
 State Senate District 09
 State Senate District 10

References
 
 United States Census Bureau 2007 TIGER/Line Shapefiles
 United States National Atlas

External links
 Cook County official site
 City-Data.com
 Illinois State Archives
 Township Officials of Illinois

Townships in Cook County, Illinois
Townships in Illinois